Alexander Ljungqvist is a Swedish economist, educator, scholar, writer, and speaker. He is a professor of finance at the Stockholm School of Economics, where he is the inaugural holder of the Stefan Persson Family Chair in Entrepreneurial Finance. His areas of expertise include corporate finance, investment banking, initial public offerings, entrepreneurial finance, private equity, venture capital, corporate governance, and asset pricing. Professor Ljungqvist teaches MBA and executive courses in private equity and venture capital and a PhD course in corporate finance.

Biography
Dr. Ljungqvist received an MSc in economics and business from Lund University in Sweden and his MA, MPhil, and DPhil degrees in economics from Nuffield College at Oxford University. After teaching for five years at Oxford University's Said Business School and Merton College, where he held the Bankers Trust Fellowship, Dr. Ljungqvist joined New York University Stern School of Business in 2000, received tenure in 2005, became a full professor in 2007, and was appointed to the Ira Rennert Chair in Finance and Entrepreneurship in 2009. Between 2014 and 2018, Dr. Ljungqvist served as the Sidney Homer Director of NYU's Salomon Center. He was previously Director of Research of NYU's Berkley Center for Entrepreneurial Studies. He left NYU in 2018 to join SSE.  He has held visiting appointments at Harvard Business School, Northwestern University's Kellogg School of Management, London Business School, the University of Sydney, Tokyo University, National University of Singapore, and Cambridge University, where he held the Sir Evelyn de Rothschild Fellowship.

From 2008 to 2014, Professor Ljungqvist served as Editor of the Review of Financial Studies, one of the leading scholarly journal in financial economics. He is also a Research Fellow of the Centre for Economic Policy Research in London, a Founder and Senior Academic Fellow of the Asian Bureau of Financial and Economic Research in Singapore, a Fellow of the Research Institute of Industrial Economics in Stockholm (IFN), a Member of the European Corporate Governance Institute in Brussels (ECGI), and a Co-Founder of the Nordic Initiative for Corporate Economics (NICE). Prior to his return to Europe in 2018, he was a Research Associate of the National Bureau of Economic Research in Cambridge, MA.

Business experience
Dr. Ljungqvist currently serves on the board of directors of the Sixth Swedish National Pension Fund (AP6), which as of 2021 manages SEK 67.3 billion of assets invested in private equity and venture capital funds and unlisted companies on behalf of the Swedish public pension system.  He has previously served as a securities market regulator via the Nasdaq Listing Council (2011-2017), on the World Economic Forum's Council of Experts overseeing the "Alternative Investments 2020" project (2012-2015), on a World Economic Forum working group tasked with "Rethinking financial innovation" (2011-2012), on the UK Department for Business Panel of Experts overseeing the 2014 review of the UK equity markets on behalf of the then Secretary of State for Business, the Rt. Hon. Sir Vince Cable (2013-2014), on the supervisory board of mAbxience SA, a European biosimilars company (2014-2016), and on the board of the Stockholm School of Economics (2018-2020). In the 2000s, he designed alternative investment strategies for Deutsche Bank Securities on Wall Street. Between 1995 and 2000, he was a senior consultant with OXERA Ltd where he advised corporate clients on questions of regulatory economics and corporate strategy. He has consulted for the European Central Bank, the World Bank, Catalano Gallardo & Petropoulos LLP, British Gas, Transco, British Telecom, United Utilities, Stagecoach, Severn Trent, Tradepoint plc, Australian Gas, Telstra, among others.

Honors and awards
In 2019, Dr. Ljungqvist was appointed a Wallenberg Scholar by the Knut and Alice Wallenberg Foundation, only the second economist to be awarded this honor. In 2011, he was honored with the Ewing Marion Kauffman Prize Medal for his work in entrepreneurship.  

Other honors and awards include the following:

2021 - EMBA Teacher of the Year Award, Stockholm School of Economics
2019 - UNSW Business School Distinguished Scholar Award
2018 - Stefan Persson Family Chair in Entrepreneurial Finance
2016 - Nominated for “Professor of the Year” Award, NYU 
2016 - Award for the Best Paper in Accounting, MIT Asia Conference
2015 - Mitsui Distinguished Visiting Scholar, University of Michigan
2015 - Johan & Jakob Söderberg Visiting Professor, Swedish House of Finance at the Stockholm School of Economics
2014 - Emerald Citations of Excellence Award 
2014 - 27th AFBC BlackRock Prize 
2014 - Award for the Best Paper in Asset Pricing, SFS Cavalcade
2014 - Charles River Associates Award for the Best Paper on Corporate Finance, WFA
2014 - Fung Visiting Professor, Hong Kong University of Science and Technology
2014 - IAS Visiting Professor, Jockey Club Institute for Advanced Study, Hong Kong
2013 - Founding Senior Academic Fellow, Asian Bureau of Finance and Economic Research
2013 - Rising Star of Finance Award
2013 - Glucksman Award, NYU
2012 - Honorary Conference Chair, Asian Finance Association meetings, Taipei
2011 - Ewing Marion Kauffman Prize Medal for Distinguished Research in Entrepreneurship
2011 - Research Associate, NBER
2011 - Emerald Citations of Excellence Award 
2011 - Sir Evelyn de Rothschild Fellow, Cambridge University
2010 - Sir Evelyn de Rothschild Fellow, Cambridge University
2009 - Ira Rennert Endowed Chair in Finance and Entrepreneurship, NYU
2009 - Argentum Best Paper Prize, European Finance Association meetings, Bergen
2009 - Teaching Excellence Award, NYU
2009 - Sir Evelyn de Rothschild Fellow, Cambridge University
2008 - Glucksman Award, NYU
2008 - Best Paper Award in Financial Markets, FMA meetings, Dallas
2007 - Research Professor of Finance, NYU
2007 - Barclays Global Investors Prize for Best Paper, Sydney
2007 - Glucksman Award, NYU
2007 - FIRN Visitor, Australia
2005 - Nominated for “Professor of the Year” Award, NYU
2005 - Research Fellow, CEPR
2004 - Charles Schaefer Faculty Fellow, NYU
2003 - Charles Schaefer Faculty Fellow, NYU
2003 - Glucksman Award, NYU
2002 - CDC Award for Best Paper, NYU
2002 - Glucksman Award, NYU
1998 - Oxford University “Best MBA Elective Teacher” Award
1996 - Bankers Trust Fellow, Merton College, Oxford
1995 - Research Affiliate, CEPR

Keynotes and invited lectures
2019 - Keynote speaker, Lund University
2019 - Keynote speaker, Swedish National PhD Workshop in Finance, Stockholm
2019 - Keynote speaker, Taiwan Finance Association, Taipei
2019 - Invited speaker, Tsinghua University, Beijing
2018 - Keynote speaker, Nippon Finance Association/Unison Capital Private Equity Forum, Tokyo
2018 - Keynote speaker, Asian Finance Association meetings, Tokyo
2018 - Keynote speaker, German Finance Association meetings, Trier
2018 - Keynote speaker, European Capital Markets Institute annual conference, Brussels
2018 - Invited lecture, Econometric Society meetings, Shanghai
2017 - Invited speaker, Asian FMA Conference, Taipei 
2017 - Invited speaker, 6th Annual Corporate Finance Conference, Exeter
2016 - Inaugural Henry Grunfeld Lecture, Chartered Institute of Bankers/Institute of Financial Services, London
2016 - Keynote speaker, 29th Australasian Finance and Banking conference, Sydney
2016 - Keynote speaker, Knut Wicksell Centre for Financial Studies, Lund
2015 - Dean’s Lecture, City University London 
2014 - Distinguished Public Lecture, Jockey Club Institute for Advanced Study, Hong Kong 
2014 - Keynote speaker, Frontiers in Finance Conference, Warwick 
2014 - Invited speaker, Asian FMA Conference, Tokyo
2014 - Invited speaker, Finance Symposium, Hong Kong University of Science and Technology
2014 - Invited speaker, Corporate Finance Conference, University of Minnesota
2012 - Keynote speaker, Coller Institute’s Private Equity Findings Symposium, London
2012 - Keynote speaker, Singapore International Finance Conference
2012 - Opening keynote, Asian Finance Association meetings, Taipei
2012 - Dean’s Distinguished Lecture, The Hong Kong Polytechnic University
2011 - Keynote speaker, Asian Finance Association meetings, Macau
2011 - Keynote speaker, Kauffman Foundation Symposium, Denver 
2011 - Keynote speaker, Finance & Accounting Forum, Brisbane
2011 - Keynote speaker, New Year’s Conference, WHU Otto Beisheim School of Management
2011 - Distinguished Lecture, NYUAD Institute, Abu Dhabi
2010 - Inaugural Sir Evelyn de Rothschild Lecture, Cambridge University
2010 - Keynote speaker, EFM Symposium on Entrepreneurial Finance & Venture Capital Markets, Montreal
2009 - Keynote speaker, Asian Finance Association meetings, Brisbane
2009 - Keynote speaker, XVII Foro de Finanzas, Spanish Finance Association (AEFIN) annual meetings, Madrid
2005 - Keynote speaker, Canadian Investment Review (CIR) Conference on Alternative Investments, Monticello

Significant scholarships
1994 - Nuffield College Third Year Scholarship, Oxford
1994 - ESRC Research Award (for studies at Oxford)
1993 - Dr. Marcus Wallenberg Scholarship (for studies at Oxford)
1993 - Citibank Scholarship (for studies at Oxford)
1993 - Royal Bank of Canada Award
1992 - ESRC Studentship (declined)
1992 - Dr. Marcus Wallenberg Scholarship (for studies at Oxford)
1992 - Citibank Scholarship (for studies at Oxford)
1991 - Jubilee Prize of the Lund Academic Society*1990 - Dr. Marcus Wallenberg Scholarship (for studies at Oxford)
1990 - Erik Nylander Scholarship (for studies at Lund University)
1989 - Michael Hansen College Scholarship (for studies at Lund University)
1989 - Erik Nylander Scholarship (for studies at Lund University)

Publications
Professor Ljungqvist has written more than forty articles, monographs, and working papers.  He has published articles in leading scholarly journals, including the Journal of Finance, the Review of Financial Studies, and the Journal of Financial Economics.

References

External links
NYU Stern Profile
Alexander Ljungqvist’s Biography
Oxford University Press
Entry in Who's Who

Swedish emigrants to the United States
New York University Stern School of Business faculty
Alumni of Nuffield College, Oxford
Swedish scholars and academics
Living people
Academics of the University of Cambridge
Academics of London Business School
Fellows of Merton College, Oxford
Lund University alumni
Year of birth missing (living people)